Cyperus szechuanensis is a species of sedge that is native to south central parts of China..

See also 
 List of Cyperus species

References 

szechuanensis
Plants described in 1956
Flora of China